The Alfred Hospital, also known as The Alfred or Alfred Hospital, is a leading tertiary teaching hospital in Melbourne, Victoria. It is the second oldest hospital in Victoria, and the oldest Melbourne hospital still operating on its original site. The Alfred is one of two major adult trauma centres in Victoria, and houses the largest intensive care unit in Australia. In 2021 it was ranked as one of the world's best hospitals. It is located at the corner of Commercial and Punt Roads, Prahran, opposite Fawkner Park.

The Alfred Hospital is managed by Alfred Health along with Caulfield Hospital and Sandringham Hospital.

History
Moves were already underway to establish a second hospital when Prince Alfred, Duke of Edinburgh, in Australia on a royal visit, was shot in an unsuccessful assassination attempt. The new "Hospital by the Yarra" (as well as Sydney's Royal Prince Alfred Hospital) was named for him. It was founded in 1871.
In 1957, The Alfred was the first hospital in Australia to place a patient on cardiopulmonary bypass to treat complex cardiac lesions. It is a major teaching hospital affiliated with Monash University.

Services
The Alfred Hospital provides specialty services in the treatment of cancer, asthma, psychiatry, and allergies, in cardiology, and in neurosurgery; houses the largest intensive care unit in Australia; and contains many unique state health facilities, including adult cystic fibrosis services and the only adult burns centre in Victoria and Tasmania. It has always been a leader in offering new treatments and services.
The Alfred is Victoria's only Adult Heart and Lung transplantation service and Australia's only Paediatric Lung transplantation service. The hospital is administered by the Metropolitan Health Service Alfred Health. In addition to being one of the two major trauma centres in Victoria, The Alfred has a helipad, located over Commercial Road.

The Alfred also benefits from collaboration with the Alfred Research Alliance, a consortium of medical research institutions located onsite.

Specialty units
Some of the specialty units within The Alfred Hospital include:

Adult Cystic Fibrosis Unit
Allergy, Asthma and Clinical Immunology – unique in Australia
Helen Macpherson Smith Burns Unit – unique in Victoria
Infectious Diseases Unit – includes state HIV/AIDS service
Lung Transplant Unit – second largest in the world
 Psychiatry Unit accommodating 60 acute inpatients, including two APICSS (Alfred Psychiatry Intensive Care Statewide Service) beds
State Major Trauma Service – including road trauma centre
The Heart Centre – World Health Organization Centre for Research and Training
Largest Mechanical Circulatory Support Service in Australasia (Ventricular Assist Devices)
Largest Adult ECMO centre in Australia
Largest Hyperbaric unit in the Southern hemisphere
William Buckland Radiotherapy Centre – Specialists in Brachytherapy, Stereotactic Radiosurgery and General External Beam Therapy.

Associated facilities 

 Deakin University's Centre for Quality and Patient Safety Research

See also
 List of hospitals in Australia
 Healthcare in Australia

Further reading

References

Hospitals in Melbourne
Medical schools in Australia
Teaching hospitals in Australia
Hospitals established in 1871
1871 establishments in Australia
Science and technology in Melbourne
Buildings and structures in the City of Melbourne (LGA)